Doerksen is a surname. Notable people with the surname include:

Arno Doerksen (born 1958), Canadian politician and current Member of the Legislative Assembly of Alberta
Brian Doerksen (born 1965), Canadian Christian singer-songwriter and worship leader from Abbotsford, British Columbia
Heather Doerksen (born 1980), Canadian actress who has appeared on stage and screen
Joe Doerksen (born 1977), Canadian mixed martial artist from New Bothwell, Manitoba
Victor Doerksen (born 1953), politician, accountant and former cabinet minister in Alberta, Canada

See also
Derksen
Dirksen (disambiguation)
Drochtersen

Russian Mennonite surnames